The Sherman may refer to:

The Sherman, a ship and restaurant, formerly the Army ferry , in San Francisco, California
The Sherman (Batesville, Indiana), hotel on the National Registry of the Historic Hotels of America
The Sherman (Omaha, Nebraska), a historic building in Omaha, Nebraska

See also
Sherman House (disambiguation)
Sherman Historic District (disambiguation)